Courts of Nevada include:
;State courts of Nevada

Supreme Court of Nevada
Nevada Court of Appeals
District Courts of Nevada (11 districts)
Municipal Courts of Nevada
Justice Courts of Nevada

Federal courts located in Nevada
United States District Court for the District of Nevada

References

External links
National Center for State Courts – directory of state court websites.

Courts in the United States